The  is the Japan Ground Self-Defense Force's special forces unit established on March 27, 2004 by the then Defense Agency to counter terrorist activities and deter guerrilla-style attacks on Japanese soil and to conduct military operations against guerrillas or enemy commandos. The unit is based in Camp Narashino in Funabashi, Chiba along with the 1st Airborne Brigade.

The SFGp has been referred to as Japan's Green Berets and Delta Force, due to their specialized role in the Japan Ground Self-Defense Force. The initial members of the Special Forces Group trained with Delta Force.

The civilian counterpart of the SFGp is the Special Assault Teams of the prefectural police departments under the Japanese National Police Agency.

While current manpower is classified, an estimated 300 operators are known to serve in the SFGp.

History
In 1998, the Defense Agency had proposed the formation of a unit within the JGSDF that would handle tasks such as counter-terrorism with a selected group of JGSDF soldiers from the 1st Airborne Brigade sent to the United States to be trained by Green Berets and Delta Force operators. At the same time, two platoons were created from the brigade to be the foundations for the new unit. These consisted of the G Platoon (Formation Unit) and the S Platoon (Research Unit).

The establishment of the unit's framework had been completed in 2003, after 3 years of training and organisation. The unit's structure is based on that of Green Berets and Delta Force, SAS(Special Air Service), KSK(Kommando Spezialkräfte), Australian Special Forces units. Bilingual 1st Special Forces Group personnel were on hand to assist the JGSDF in creating their Table of Organization and Equipment (TO&E). Takashi Araya once mentioned in an interview that he trained with Green Berets abroad for a year.

On March 27, 2004, the Defense Agency activated the unit as the Special Operations Group with the mandate under the JGSDF as its counter-terrorist unit.

In 2005, the SFGp had deployed four of its operators to serve as bodyguards for the commander of the JGSDF's contingent in Iraq under the Japanese Iraq Reconstruction and Support Group.

On March 28, 2007, the SFGp, along with the 1st Airborne Brigade, the 1st Helicopter Brigade, and the 101st NBC Protection Unit, became part of the newly created Central Readiness Force.

The unit changed its English name on March 26, 2008 from SOG to SFGp or the Special Forces Group.

On page 14 of the January–March 2014 edition of「Special Warfare」, authorized official bimonthly publication by the John F. Kennedy Special Warfare Center and School and Fort Bragg, the U.S. Army Green Berets 1st SFG(A) and the JGSDF SFGp conduct a bilateral exercise "Silent Eagle," each fall at JBLM in Washington State.

In 2016, the SFGp was placed on standby during the 42nd G7 summit in case their assistance is required to back up the Special Assault Team and the Anti-Firearms Squad.

On page 83 of the October–December 2017 edition of「Special Warfare」, authorized official bimonthly publication by the John F. Kennedy Special Warfare Center and School and Fort Bragg, the strongest relationship and history between the U.S. Army Green Beret 1st SFG(A) 1st Battalion stationed in Okinawa, and JGSDF SFGp, as well as the training conducted by the former USPACOM subordinated Green Berets CRF(Crisis Response Force) and JGSDF SFGp at Joint Combined Exchange Training(JCET) in Camp Narashino and Okinawa on various missions, including direct action(DA), hostage rescue(HR), urban movement and mobility on rotary wing and vehicle platforms.

On January 18, 2018, the SFGp conducted one of their few exercises before the presence of the Australian and Japanese prime ministers. At least one SFGp operator was an observer at the Special Operations Forces Industry Conference (SOFIC) 2018 exercises in Florida. King Abdullah II of Jordan visited Japan and was given a demonstration by SFGp operators on November 27, 2018.

On February 18, 2019, unnamed SFGp operators were deployed to attend Flintlock military exercises in Africa. On November 5, 2021, the SFGp has trained in Guam with the Green Berets. Exercises between the 1st Special Forces Group and the SFGp are conducted yearly under the codename Silent Eagle.

On June 29, 2021, then Prime Minister Yoshihide Suga visited maneuvers performed by SFGp operators.

On August, 2022, Joint counter-terrorism exercise「Exercise Dusk Samurai 2022」with the Australian Army 2nd Commando Regiment at Sydney Parramatta, Australia, was posted on the Australian Department of Defence (Australia) official website.

On October 6, 2022, Posted on the JGSDF official website, Facebook, Instagram, Twitter that the SFGp and the Australian Army Special Operations Command (Australia) conducted field training in Australia in August 2022.
This is the first official announcement by the JGSDF regarding SFGp's training and joint training between SFGp and special forces units of other countries (This was the sixth joint exercise with the Australian Army Special Forces since 2015）.

Volume 19, number 1, 2023 of 「Veritas」, a publication published by the U.S. Army Special Operations Command History Office, contains a description of SFGp and details of joint exercise「Silent Eagle 2011」, a joint exercise between SFGp and the U.S. Army Green Berets 1st SFG(A).

On March 16, 2023, Posted on the JGSDF official website, Facebook, Instagram, Twitter that the SFGp and the U.S. Army Special Operations Command (Green Berets) conducted field training in United States in January to February 2023.

On March 17, 2023, posted on the U.S. Army Green Berets 1st Special Forces Group(A) official Facebook and Instagram that the SFGp and 1st SFG(A) with United States Special Operations Command(USSOCOM) conducted joint training in February 2023.

Formation

According to a 2017 Gendai Ismedia article, the SFGp is reported to compose of the following:

 Commander (Led by a Colonel)
 Executive Officers (Led by a Lieutenant Colonel)
 Headquarters
 1st Department (General Affairs)
 2nd Department (Intelligence)
 3rd Department (Planning)
 4th Department (Supply)
 Headquarters Administration Unit (Led by 3 Majors)
 1st SFGp Company
 Company Headquarters
 1st Platoon (HALO)
 Specialized squads (e.g. Assault, Sniper)
 2nd Platoon (Naval warfare)
 3rd Platoon (Mountain warfare)
 4th Platoon (Urban warfare)
 2nd SFGp Company
 3rd SFGp Company
 Training Unit

Training
Potential recruits to the SFGp are drawn from Ranger-qualified JGSDF soldiers and paratroopers of the 1st Airborne Brigade. The unit's passing rate is said to be at 3% due to demanding physical fitness qualifications aside from a recruit's ranger or airborne qualifications.

SFGp operators are required to study English in order to be bilingual, although they are trained to learn other languages like Arabic, Chinese and Russian.

When the first soldiers were recruited, there was an effort for them to have foreign training due to a lack of experience. According to Takashi Araya, he had to train with the Green Berets in order to be familiarized with modern special forces concepts since those who are Ranger-trained and those who are in the SFGp are not different in terms of their training. Others were given training by various private military contractors when they have free time in either the US or in the UK with their own money.

The SFGp does joint exercises with the SAT.

Weapons

Assault rifles
 Colt M4A1 SOPMOD Block I: Allegedly armed with M203s and QDSS-NT4 suppressors, which was denied by the JGSDF due to an incident where an American soldier named Tomoaki Iishiba was arrested for violating American export laws.
 Howa Type 89
 HK G36
 Heckler & Koch HK416
 FN SCAR

Battle Rifles
 Heckler & Koch HK417
 FN SCAR

Sub-machine guns
 Heckler & Koch MP5
 Heckler & Koch MP7

Shotguns
 Remington Model 870 (Wilson Combat-based)

Pistols
 Heckler & Koch USP (Reportedly a Tactical version as they're used with suppressors)

Sniper rifles
 Remington M24

Equipment
The SFGp has access to equipment used by the JGSDF, such as the Komatsu LAVs and Toyota Koukidoushas for transport and reconnaissance use. They also work in conjunction with the 1st Helicopter Brigade to provide mobility support, though they can be also deployed via C-130 Hercules aircraft.

SFGp operators are known to wear camo uniforms when operating in urbanized areas.

Unit features
As part of regulating and protecting the identities of the various soldiers serving in the SFGp, their faces are hidden in balaclavas and cannot be revealed except with authorization from their commanding officers. SFGp officers are exempted from the rule.

References

Miscellaneous notes
 Companies of the Japanese Special Forces Group are under the command of a Major.
 Company HQ and the platoons under it are also found within the 2nd and 3rd SOG companies.
 Commanded by a Lieutenant.

Bibliography

External links
 Official SFGp CRF Page.  

Military counterterrorist organizations
Special forces of Japan
Military units and formations established in 2004